Cathedral City High School is a public high school for grades 9-12. It is located in Cathedral City, California and is part of the Palm Springs Unified School District.

History
The school was established in 1991.

Athletics
 
 DVL Champs Football- 1994,1999, 2000
 CIF Champs Basketball-1997
 DVL Champs Basketball-1997, 1998, 1999, 2000, 2001, 2004, 2007, 2008
 CIF Champs Soccer-1995, 2003
 DVL Champs Soccer-1993, 1995, 1997, 1998, 2000, 2003, 2004, 2005
 DVL Champs Baseball-2001, 2004, 2007, 2008
 CIF Champs Girls Swimming-1997
 CIF Semi-Finalist Girls Soccer-2009

Notable alumni

 Timothy Ray Bradley Jr. (born 29 August 1983) WBO World Light Welterweight Champion.
 Jeff Jericho (born 25 November 1985), an American hip hop recording artist.
 Cub Swanson (born November 2, 1983) Professional Mixed Martial Artist, current featherweight contender for the UFC.
 Jeremy Thornburg (born May 7, 1982 in Cathedral City, California) is an American football safety who played for the Green Bay Packers.

References

 

High schools in Riverside County, California
Educational institutions established in 1991
Cathedral City, California
Public high schools in California
1991 establishments in California